Shani Mootoo, writer, visual artist and video maker, was born in Dublin, Ireland, in 1957 to Trinidadian parents. She grew up in Trinidad and relocated at the age of 19 to Vancouver, British Columbia, Canada. She currently lives in Toronto, Ontario, Canada.

Biography

Early life and education
At an early age Mootoo showed a talent for drawing, painting, and writing, and expressed interest in becoming an artist at the age of 10. Her early efforts were encouraged by her mother Indra (née Samaroo).  Mootoo's father, Ramesh Mootoo, was a medical family doctor and Trinidadian politician; much of Shani Mootoo's personal and literary life has been focused on political activism. According to Mootoo, her parents were upset by some of her earliest poems because they described love between two men or love between two women. She has also said that her parents worried for what those themes might mean for her future, which is why she put her words away and chose to paint instead. She claims that she came back to writing accidentally and expressed a worry that she was not a writer but a painter first. As an adult, Mootoo has discussed being sexually assaulted by one of her grandfather's friends.

Mootoo earned a Fine Arts BFA Degree at the University of Western Ontario in 1980 and an MA in English and Theatre from the University of Guelph, 2010. As a multimedia visual artist in Vancouver and New York City, where she lived from 1994 to 1999, she explored in her paintings, photographs and videos themes of gender, sexuality, and race. The themes of her work resonated with Mootoo's experiences as an adolescent in Trinidad and as an immigrant adult in Canada. Her visual art and video work have traveled and been acclaimed internationally. She is now teaching the Creative Writing Program at the University of Toronto.

Visual and video art
Mootoo's visual art and video work have been exhibited internationally, including at the New York Museum of Modern Art. On the topic of her visual work, Mootoo has said that as a victim of child abuse she found it safer to use pictures rather than words.  Mootoo uses her art as a way to deal with the trauma of her childhood and has discussed feelings of confusion as to why the universe would let child abuse happen, while also claiming that as a survivor, she and all those that have suffered at the hands of abusers must come to terms with the trauma and understand what to do with suffering. Mootoo's film and video work was revisited by Rungh in its program Longing and Belonging: 1990s South Asian Film and Video which was a featured program at the 2019 DOXA Documentary Film Festival. Mootoo reflected on her film and video work in the 1990s in a newly commissioned article, Streams Coming Together: 1990s video in Vancouver and beyond.

Literary career
Mootoo's first literary publication, Out on Main Street, a collection of short stories, was solicited by the Vancouver-based feminist publishing house Press Gang in 1993 and was the beginning of her literary career. Her first full-length novel, Cereus Blooms at Night, published by Press Gang in 1996, was shortlisted for the Scotia Bank Giller Prize in 1997, the Ethel Wilson Fiction Prize, and the Chapters Books in Canada First Novel Award. It has been published in 15 countries and won the New England Book Sellers Award in 1998. Set on a tropical island, the novel is narrated by a male nurse and caretaker, and explores trauma, madness and redemption, the legacies of sexual abuse, and the boundaries between heterosexual and homosexual desire.

In 2002, Mootoo followed her first novel with a collection of poetry, The Predicament of Or.

Mootoo's second full-length novel, He Drown She in the Sea, was published in 2005. It made the long list for the International Dublin Literary Award in 2007.

Mootoo's 2008 novel, Valmiki's Daughter, is set in San Fernando, Trinidad, and depicts a father and daughter who struggle to come to terms with secrets. Mootoo has said that the story is about a father trying to help his daughter from leading the same kind of closeted life that he has led. Viveka and her father's lives are each underpinned by the constraints of class and race, and most importantly by the sexual conventions of their society. Set against its strongly evoked backdrop of place, the novel charts Viveka's coming to terms with the hard understanding that love faces society's obstacles, and her knowledge of her certain survival. Valmiki's Daughter was long-listed for 2009's Scotiabank Giller Prize. In an interview Mootoo has explained her realization that she had written about food on almost every page of Valmiki's Daughter without realizing so. She discusses the importance of food and entertaining people in Trinidadian Culture, as well as in her life and her other work.

Mootoo's two most recent novels, Moving Forward Sideways like a Crab (2014) and Polar Vortex (2020), were also shortlisted for the Giller Prize.

Mootoo's novels are found on course lists in the Departments of English, Liberal Arts, Women's Studies, and Cultural Studies at universities in the Caribbean, Canada, the United States, England, Europe, India, and Australia.

Mootoo's literary papers are held at Simon Fraser University Special Collections and Rare Books. The fonds contain "printed typescripts of published works with drafts and related working papers, published reviews, drafts of unpublished works, lecture notes, professional correspondence, notebooks and sketchbooks, video productions in VHS format, audio materials and works of visual art".

In 2022 the Writers' Trust of Canada awarded Mootoo its Writers' Trust Engel/Findley Award for her body of work.

Other projects
Mootoo has served as writer in residence at the University of Alberta, the University of Guelph and the University of the West Indies, as a visiting scholar at Mills College in California, US, and frequently speaks and read internationally. In 2008, the University of the West Indies, Cave Hill, Barbados, hosted a "Symposium on the Fictions of Shani Mootoo in the Context of Caribbean Women's Writings".

In 2009, she served on the jury for the Dayne Ogilvie Prize, a literary award for emerging LGBT writers in Canada, selecting Debra Anderson as that year's prize winner.

Mootoo has spoken out against child abuse and in 1989 she addressed Sex Offenders at Stave Lake Correctional Centre about being a survivor of child abuse and suffering.

Videos written, directed and filmed by Shani Mootoo
 And the Rest is Drag, 32 mins, 2010 with Melisa Brittain and Danielle Peers (KingCrip Productions)
 View, 8 mins, 2000
 Guerita and Prietita, 23 mins, 1999 with Kath High
 Her Sweetness Lingers, 18 mins, 1998
The Wild Woman in the Woods, 12 mins, 1992
A Paddle and a Compass, 8 mins, 1992 with Wendy Oberlander
English Lesson, 5 mins, 1990
Lest I Burn, 8 mins, 1989

Selected visual art exhibitions and video screenings
Topographies, The Vancouver Art Gallery, 1997
Transculture,  The Venice Biennale, Venice, Italy, 1995
The Museum of Modern Art, New York City, New York, USA, 1994, 1995
Queens Museum, New York, USA, 1995
Solo Exhibition, The National Gallery, Port of Spain, Trinidad, 1980

Bibliography
 Out on Main Street (1993)
 Cereus Blooms at Night (1996) (shortlisted for the Scotiabank Giller Prize)
 The Predicament of or (2001)
 He Drown She in the Sea (2005)
 Valmiki's Daughter (2009) (longlisted for the Scotiabank Giller Prize)
 Moving Forward Sideways like a Crab (2014) (longlisted for the Scotiabank Giller Prize)
 Polar Vortex (2020) (shortlisted for the Scotiabank Giller Prize)

References

External links 
Records of Shani Mootoo are held by Simon Fraser University's Special Collections and Rare Books
Recordings of Shani Mootoo are available online in the Unarchiving the Margins Collection at Simon Fraser University's Special Collections and Rare Books
 Rungh

1958 births
Living people
Canadian multimedia artists
Canadian women novelists
Canadian photographers
Canadian video artists
Women video artists
Canadian women painters
Canadian writers of Asian descent
Canadian contemporary painters
Canadian people of Indian descent
Irish LGBT writers
Trinidad and Tobago emigrants to Canada
Trinidad and Tobago people of Indian descent
Academic staff of the University of Alberta
University of Western Ontario alumni
University of Guelph alumni
20th-century Canadian novelists
21st-century Canadian novelists
Canadian LGBT novelists
Trinidad and Tobago women novelists
Trinidad and Tobago novelists
20th-century Canadian women writers
21st-century Canadian women writers
21st-century Canadian women artists
Canadian lesbian writers
Lesbian novelists
21st-century Canadian LGBT people
20th-century Canadian LGBT people